The Great Ecstasy of Woodcarver Steiner is a 1974 documentary film by German filmmaker Werner Herzog. It is about Walter Steiner, a celebrated ski jumper of his era who worked as a carpenter for his full-time occupation. Showcased is Steiner's quest for a world record in ski flying, as well as the dangers involved in the sport. Herzog has considered it one of his "most important films."

Production
The film includes footage shot in the German towns of Oberstdorf and Garmisch-Partenkirchen, as well as Planica in Yugoslavia (now Slovenia). The film was made as part of a series for a German television station, which restricted in some ways the content. Herzog's original cut was 60 minutes long, but it was edited down to 45 minutes to fit in a one-hour television spot. The station also required Herzog himself to appear on camera, which he had not typically done in his previous documentaries.

See also
Ski flying
List of longest ski jumps

References

External links

Review at Fanzine

1974 films
1974 television films
West German films
1970s German-language films
German-language television shows
Documentary films about spirituality
German documentary television films
1974 documentary films
Films directed by Werner Herzog
Films scored by Popol Vuh (band)
Films set in the Alps
Skiing films
1970s German films